DXAA (pronounced DX-double-A; 92.5 FM) is a radio station owned and operated by Andres Bonifacio College Broadcasting System. The station's studios and transmitter are located at the 3rd Floor Amando B. Amatong Civic Center, College Park, Dipolog, Zamboanga del Norte.

Incidents and controversies
On May 3, 2005, DXAA personality Klein Cantoneros was shot in an ambush in Santa Filomena, leading to his death the next day.

References

Radio stations established in 1997
Radio stations in Zamboanga del Norte